Muhammad Nazaki was a Sultan of Kano who reigned from 1618-1623.

Biography in the Kano Chronicle
Below is a biography of Muhammad Nazaki from Palmer's 1908 English translation of the Kano Chronicle.

References

Monarchs of Kano